Bernhard Eitel (born 31 August 1959) is a German earth scientist and geographer. 

Eitel was born in Baden. Since October 2007, he has been the Rector of Heidelberg University.

References

See also
 Sustainable Development

German earth scientists
Living people
1959 births
Heads of universities in Germany